This is a list of the singers, conductors, and dancers who have appeared in at least 100 performances at the Metropolitan Opera, last updated September 21, 2019. Performers are listed by the number of the performances they have appeared in as found at the Metropolitan Opera Archives. The number of performances and last performance date listed may not be current as numbers change with new productions.


References

External links
Metropolitan Opera Database

 Performers
Metropolitan Opera
 
Metropolitan Opera Performers
Metropolitan Opera
American music-related lists